Rödersheim-Gronau is a municipality in the Rhein-Pfalz-Kreis, in Rhineland-Palatinate, Germany.

References

Rhein-Pfalz-Kreis